The Heathfield transmitting station is a facility for FM and television transmission at Heathfield, East Sussex, UK (grid reference TQ566220). A Group B (or wideband or K group) horizontally polarised aerial is required to receive digital TV signals. The original analogue signals were in the Group C/D band, but all the digital MUXES should still be receivable on a C/D group aerial in reasonable signal areas (see graph).

The station's coverage area suffers from co-channel interference problems, particularly to the south, not only with Brighton (Whitehawk Hill) but with the continent as well. It is owned and operated by Arqiva.

Along with Dover, Bluebell Hill and Brighton Whitehawk Hill, Heathfield transmits regional television services from BBC One South East and ITV Meridian (east).

Services listed by frequency

Analogue radio

Digital radio

Digital television

Aerial Group: B
Polarisation: Horizontal
Heathfield completed 700 MHz clearance on 19 July 2018, therefore ceasing the use of UHF 49 and UHF 52.

Before switchover

Aerial group: W

Analogue television
BBC2 closed on 30 May 2012. The remaining analogue services closed on 13 June 2012.

Aerial group: C/D
Polarisation: horizontal

References

External links
The Transmission Gallery: Heathfield Transmitter photographs and information
Info and pictures of Heathfield transmitter including historical power/frequency changes and present co-receivable transmitters
Heathfield Transmitter at thebigtower.com

Transmitter sites in England